In heraldry, a mount (also mountain, hill, hillock) is a representation of a hill or mountain as a curved terrace in base. When the mount is included in the lower part of the shield, it may be considered an ordinary rather than a charge.

A trimount, also described as a mount mounted, or shapournet shapourned, is a representation of a mount with three tops. For mounts with more than three tops, the number of tops is blazoned as coupeaux (e.g. a mount with six coupeaux). 

The trimount (in German, Dreiberg) can be found in all heraldic traditions (Gallo-British, German-Nordic and Latin), but it is especially common in Switzerland.

A design of six hills (Sechsberg) can also be found in Swiss and Italian heraldry. In medieval German heraldry, mounts could have ten or more tops. Mounts with more than three tops are blazoned as a mount of N coupeaux, e.g. German Sechsberg would be a mount of six coupeaux, German Zehnberg as a mount of ten coupeaux. A mount with more than six tops can also be blazoned as Schroffen in German heraldry.

Terrace in base curved
A terrace in base curved is blazoned mount, hill or hillock when represented in vert; sometimes as a mount vert for clarity. Sometines, a terrace in base curved may be blazoned as mount even when not tinctured vert. This is mostly found in cases where the base represents a hill for one or several of the charges in the coat of arms. Classification either as an ordinary or, in many cases, as a charge, is a matter of interpretation.

Double mount

Trimount
The coats of arms of Hungary and Slovakia depict a trimount with a double cross, first used in the seal of Stephen V of Hungary (r. 1270–1272). 
At first, it was only a small element at the bottom of the coat of arms, later it became regular heraldic figure. Originally it represented biblical Golgota. Modern day Slovak interpretation is that it represents three mountain ranges of the Kingdom of Hungary: the Tatra, Fatra, and Mátra.  

The representation of three pointed mountains (not a heraldic trimount) in the 1991 coat of arms of Slovenia symbolises Triglav, the highest mountain in Slovenia.

Mount of four coupeaux

Mount of five coupeaux

Mount of six coupeaux

Mount of ten coupeaux

Mount of twelve coupeaux

References 

Heraldic charges
Heraldic ordinaries